Ministry of Economic Development  (Polish: Ministerstwo Rozwoju) was the office of government in Poland responsible for economy and regional development. Mateusz Morawiecki was the last Minister of Development. It was created in late 2015 from the split of the Ministry of Infrastructure and Development and dissolved in 2018, after creation of Ministry of Investment and Economic Development.

15 November 2019  the ministry has been reactivated at the forefront Jadwiga Emilewicz

Footnotes

Government ministries of Poland
2015 establishments in Poland
Ministries established in 2015
Ministries disestablished in 2020